In Greek mythology, Myrsine is an Attic girl who won the favour of Athena thanks to her impressive athletic achievements and her beauty, and the envy of the other Atticans for the same reason. Her brief tale survives in the Geoponica, a Byzantine Greek collection of agricultural lore, compiled during the tenth century in Constantinople for the Byzantine emperor Constantine VII Porphyrogenitus.

Etymology 
The Ancient Greek word  (myrsínē) means 'myrtle'. Other spellings and forms include  (myrrhínē), masc. Robert Beekes suggested a pre-Greek origin due to the myrt-/myrs- variation.

Mythology 
Myrsine surpassed all girls in beauty and all boys in strength, winning herself the favour and love of Athena, the virgin goddess of wisdom and patron-goddess of Attica. She excessed in both the ring and the race, beating all her opponents. Many of her fellow athletes whom she had beaten grew resentful of her, so in envy they murdered her. But Athena took pity in her favourite, and turned the dead girl into a myrtle, which was 'not less acceptable to Athena than the olive tree'. A similar, almost word-for-word, story was also told about another maiden, Elaea, who was changed into an olive tree.

The myrtle was also seen as Aphrodite's sacred plant, and she too had a story connecting her to it.

See also 

 Arachne
 Myrina
 Myrmex

References

Bibliography 
 
 
 
 
  Online version at Perseus.tufts project.
 
 

Attican characters in Greek mythology
Metamorphoses into flowers in Greek mythology
Deeds of Athena
Women in Greek mythology